St Andrews Football Club are a football club based in Aylestone, a suburb of Leicester, England.

History
They joined Division One of the Leicestershire Senior League in 1985 and promoted to the Premier Division after two seasons. The Andrews are three-time champions of the Leicestershire Senior League Premier Division. In the 1994–95 season, the Drews reached the 5th round of the FA Vase.

The 2013–14 season saw the side reach the semi-final of the FA Vase.  The run included victories against several Step 5 sides along the way including away victories at AFC Rushden and Diamonds and East Preston.

The semi-final draw gave the Andrews a two-legged tie against much favoured West Auckland. A goalless draw was played out in the first leg, which provided a chance of a bumper attendance at Canal Street for the return tie. A record 1,600 crowd in the second leg saw St Andrews go 1–0 up with a goal by Brady Hickey.  It was not to be for the Andrews as two goals for West Auckland in the last 11 minutes from set pieces put an end to the Vase run.

Ground
The first team and reserves play at Canal Street in Aylestone.

Honours
East Midlands Counties League (1): 2015–16
Leicestershire Senior League (3): 1989–90, 1993–94, 1995–96
Leicestershire Challenge Cup (1): 1997

Records
FA Cup
Preliminary round: 2009–10
FA Vase
Semi-final: 2013–14

References

External links
Official website

Football clubs in England
Sport in Leicester
Association football clubs established in 1973
Leicestershire Senior League
East Midlands Counties Football League
Midland Football League
United Counties League
Football clubs in Leicestershire
1973 establishments in England